Kenny Robert van Hummel (born 30 September 1982) is a retired road bicycle racer from the Netherlands, who specialised in sprint finishes.

Career
Born in Elden, Gelderland, van Hummel started cycling races at the age of seven, and one year later he became a member of cycling club "De Adelaar" in Apeldoorn. He had a successful youth career, and at 1998 joined the Rabobank youth team. He started road races and cyclo-cross races. In 2000, his second year as a junior, he came in fourth in the 2000 UCI Cyclo-cross World Championships for juniors.

In 2004, van Hummel changed teams to Van Hemert-Eurogifts. Van Hummel won a sprint in the ZLM Tour, and became second in the national championships for espoirs. One year later, Van Hummel won the Dutch road race championship for cyclists without professional contract, and won five criteriums.

In that year he reached the podium in stages of the Tour of Belgium and the ENECO Tour, and won the Tour of North-Holland, which finished in a sprint.

2009 was a successful year for Van Hummel, especially the month of May. He won five races, the Profronde van Fryslan, Dutch Food Valley Classic, the Tour de Rijke and a stage in the Four Days of Dunkirk, and confirmed that he could win sprints as a professional. He became leader in the 2008–2009 UCI Europe Tour.
At the Dutch National Road Race Championships, Van Hummel was competing for the win all day. Koos Moerenhout escaped close to the end, but Van Hummel finished second by winning the sprint.

Van Hummel was selected to join the 2009 Tour de France, after his team  received a wildcard. Van Hummel was the first one to leave in time trial in the first stage, and finished the time trial in the second-worst time. After the sixth stage, Van Hummel was ranked last in the general classification. In the following mountain stages, Van Hummel could not keep up with the other cyclists, and finished among the last cyclists every day, sometimes riding tens of kilometers on his own, with a large margin to the other cyclists.  His difficulties were increased by the fact that his team felt they could not afford to devote a domestique to assist Van Hummel (as is commonly done for other sprinters such as Mark Cavendish), as they could not afford to run the risk of having both riders disqualified.  His daily struggle against the time limit, and his positive attitude made him a popular cyclist in the Netherlands. In the seventeenth stage, he fell and had to leave the race due to his sustained injuries.

After the mountain stages, the French newspaper L'Équipe named Van Hummel the "worst climber ever" in the Tour de France. The newspaper said that it never happened before that the same cyclist finished last in every mountain stage. What they did not say was that some other riders already left the tour because of the heavy mountain stages.

Van Hummel joined  for the 2012 season, having signed a two-year deal.

Van Hummel joined  for the 2014 season, after his previous team –  – folded at the end of the 2013 season.

Personal life
Van Hummel used to live in Driel, before moving to Elden.

Major results

2000
 2nd Time trial, National Junior Road Championships
2001
 9th Paris–Roubaix Espoirs
2002
 2nd Ronde van Overijssel
2003
 4th ZLM Tour
2004
 1st ZLM Tour
 2nd Road race, National Under-23 Road Championships
 8th Rund um die Nürnberger Altstadt
2005
 3rd Grote Prijs Stad Zottegem
 4th Noord-Nederland Tour
 5th Beverbeek Classic
 7th Omloop van het Houtland
 9th Overall Olympia's Tour
 10th Omloop der Kempen
 10th Rund um die Nürnberger Altstadt
2006
 3rd Madison, National Track Championships (with Aart Vierhouten)
 5th International Grand Prix Doha
 8th Dutch Food Valley Classic
 8th Noord-Nederland Tour
 8th Ronde van Midden-Zeeland
 9th Kampioenschap van Vlaanderen
2007
 1st Ronde van Noord-Holland
 2nd Grote Prijs Gerrie Knetemann
 5th Schaal Sels
 6th Kuurne–Brussels–Kuurne
2008
 4th Dutch Food Valley Classic
 10th Paris–Brussels
2009
 1st Ronde van Overijssel
 1st Batavus Pro Race
 1st Dutch Food Valley Classic
 1st Tour de Rijke
 1st Peperbus Profspektakel
 1st Stage 1 Four Days of Dunkirk
 2nd Road race, National Road Championships
 2nd Ronde van Drenthe
 2nd Scheldeprijs
 2nd Ronde van Noord-Holland
 3rd Arno Wallaard Memorial
 8th Münsterland Giro
 2010
 Tour of Hainan
1st Stages 4, 5, 7 & 9
 1st Stage 1 Tour de Picardie
 1st Stage 2 Tour of Belgium
 2nd Arno Wallaard Memorial
 2nd Dutch Food Valley Classic
 2nd Omloop van het Houtland
 4th Ronde van Overijssel
 5th Ronde van het Groene Hart
 8th Trofeo Cala Millor
 8th Profronde van Fryslan
 2011
 1st Overall Ronde van Drenthe
1st Stages 1 & 2
 1st Memorial Rik Van Steenbergen
 Tour of Hainan
1st Points classification
1st Stages 6, 7 & 9
 1st Stage 8 Tour of Turkey
 2nd Handzame Classic
 2nd Tour de Rijke
 7th Nationale Sluitingsprijs
 10th Scheldeprijs
2012
 2nd Overall Tour de Picardie
1st Stage 2
 2nd Memorial Rik Van Steenbergen
 2nd Grand Prix d'Isbergues
 3rd Kuurne–Brussels–Kuurne
 5th Handzame Classic
 5th Ronde van Zeeland Seaports
 5th Halle–Ingooigem
 6th Grand Prix de Denain
 9th Paris–Brussels
2013
 2nd Overall Arctic Race of Norway
1st Stage 1
 2nd Handzame Classic
 3rd Overall Tour de Picardie
 3rd Ronde van Zeeland Seaports
 3rd Dutch Food Valley Classic
 5th Omloop van het Houtland
2014
 1st Stage 6 Tour de Langkawi
 1st Stage 1 Tour d'Azerbaïdjan
 1st Stage 10 Vuelta a Venezuela
 4th Grand Prix de Denain
 4th Grote Prijs Jef Scherens
 6th Kampioenschap van Vlaanderen
 8th Volta Limburg Classic
 9th Ronde van Zeeland Seaports

Grand Tour general classification results timeline

References

External links

 Profile on Skil-Shimano official website
  

1982 births
Living people
Dutch male cyclists
Sportspeople from Arnhem
Presidential Cycling Tour of Turkey stage winners
Cyclists from Gelderland
21st-century Dutch people